Fujima (written: 藤間 or 藤真) is a Japanese surname. Notable people with the surname include:

, Japanese dancer
, Japanese handball player
, Japanese dancer and actress
, Japanese actress

Japanese-language surnames